Shueh-li Ong (Mandarin Chinese 王雪莉) is an Australian born composer, producer, arranger and multi-instrumentalist (thereminist, synthesizer, sound designer, performer and vocalist) residing in the United States since 2005.

Education 
Ong was a student of electronic music while studying classical piano at the Elder Conservatorium of Music, University of Adelaide in Australia, with interactive multimedia techniques as her area of research. The research involved 2D-3D computer animation, generative music and extended synth techniques in live virtuosic performance. She also had a Graduate Diploma in Contemporary Music Technology from La Trobe University, Australia.

Music career
Ong and Michael Spicer came to Singapore in 1993 and formed a music company, Electric Muse, in 1998. Ong was the business development manager and Spicer was the consultant for Electric Muse. In 1999, Electric Muse made its first full-length performance, A Tale Of Metal And Music, in the Singapore Arts Festival Fringe's Late Night Series.

Ong is founder and composer of electronic group Xenovibes with John Martinez; whose goal was to mingle her Asian and Western musical influences in a personal style shaped by her classical and electronic music training in studio and live performance.  With Martinez, Ong also co-directed a music academy in the United States.

Ong has released four CDs written and produced by her. She has also written and produced shows and/or original music including theatrical productions, staged performances and live concerts, and is possibly the first thereminist to have performed at the Dallas Museum of Art (2005), Grapevine Opry (2008), State Fair of Texas (2007), Moogfest (2007), NJProghouse (2013), and the Steinway Piano Gallery Nashville (2012).

Ong plays her Bob Moog customized Etherwave and Epro, with the volume antenna inverted.

Shueh-li has been a contributor to the Singapore Arts Magazine, and South-east Asian music blog, Sonicfreakz.

Personal life
Ong was born in Australia and is a Singapore permanent resident. Ong is currently based in Nashville, Tennessee, United States since 2005.

Discography

Own Works

Singles
 2021 Jan 2 Together
 2020 Oct The Universe
 2017 May 17 Delight
 2017 Oct 27 Jeune et Animée
 2013 Jan 1 Thriller (cover)
 2012 May 28 My Summertime Dreams
 2012 March 22 Ice Rain
 2011 August 8 A Working Title
 2011 June 14 Leave Me In Stasis (Guest appearance by Tom Brislin on piano)
 2011 May 23 Deja vu-Love voodoo
 2010 Dec 9 I'm leaving you a message

Albums
 2012 Aug 4 A Working Title - special edition
 2009 *Xing Paths (arranged and produced, released under Xenovibes) 
 2007 Music From Another Land (released under Xenovibes)
 2004 Shueh-li’s Xenovibes the Premier DVD
 2003 Shueh-li’s Xenovibes

Other Recordings
 2020 Fito Páez - La Conquista Del Espacio CD [theremin on track La Canción de las Bestias]
 2017 3RDegree - Ones & Zeros: Volume 0 CD (theremin)
 2014 Indie film - Thong Girl vs Xolta from Outer Space Thong Girl Vs Xolta from Outer Space (theremin)
 2014 Little Dipper - Last Broadcast CD (theremin)
 2012 Tom Brislin - Hurry Up And Smell The Roses CD (theremin, synthesizer, engineer)
 2007 Robert Casteels - Taman Suara 2. Pontianak (theremin)

Original Shows/Live Performance Credits
 1999 Metal and Music - Electronic Opera by Ong. Singapore Arts Festival. Also appearing Michael Spicer of Redgum Australia.
 2000 Timega Theory - Electronic Opera by Ong. Melbourne Arts Festival. Also appearing Michael Spicer.
 2001 Timega Theory - Electronic Opera by Ong. National University of Singapore. Also appearing Michael Spicer.
 2004 Shueh-li’s Xenovibes - Singapore. Guest appearance by drummer John Anthony Martinez and guitarist Jeff Long.
 2005 Shueh-li’s Xenovibes - Dallas TX. Guest appearance by bassist Mike McKinney and wind-player Shelley Carrol (Duke Ellington Orchestra.)
 2005 Xenovibes Fall05 Tour (Dallas TX) - Dallas Museum of Art, Palace Theater and Eisemann Center. Guest appearances by bassist Chuck Smith and guitarist Bill Ham (Bread (band))
 2006 Water Tower’s ‘Out of the Loop Festival’. Guest appearances by bassist George Anderson (Shakatak) and Bill Ham.
 2007 Club Dada, Liquid Lounge, Amsterdam Bar - Dallas TX. Guest appearance by Bernard Wright.
 2007 Moogfest - B B King, NYC, USA.
 2007 State Fair of Texas - USA.
 2008 EtherMusicFest - Asheville NC, USA.
 2008 Return to Singapore Tour. Guest appearance by keyboardist ‘Face’.
 2008 Grapevine Opry's 21st Anniversary Show, USA.
 2010 Singapore Esplanade (Flipside). Together with the Artsylum Quartet.
 2012 Steinway Piano Gallery (CD release concert). Guest appearance by Beegie Adair, Elisabeth Small and Tom Brislin.
 2013 NJ Proghouse Progressive Music Series.
 2014 Steinway Piano Gallery Nashville. "Shueh-li Presents".
 2014 Switched On : Birth of the Moog Synth exhibit - History Ctr, Ithaca NY
 2015 Steinway Piano Gallery Nashville. "Shueh-li Presents". Guest appearance by Eric Struthers (Aaron Neville Quartet)
 2015 Moog Birthday Bash - History Ctr, Ithaca NY. Also appearing Malcolm Cecil, David Borden, Herb Deutsch, Trevor Pinch.

Original Music (and Performance)
 1999 TheatreWorks (Singapore) "On Mercury's Wings"- Singapore.
 2001 The Necessary Stage "Spoilt" - Singapore.
 2003 International Computer Music Conference - Singapore.

References

External links
 Official Website : Shueh-li Ong
 Finding the Perfect Pitch - TheAsiaMag; Through Asian Eyes

Singaporean musicians
Theremin players
Australian keyboardists
Australian expatriates in the United States
Living people
Year of birth missing (living people)